The 2012 season is Stabæk's 7th consecutive year in Tippeligaen, and their 17th season in the top flight of Norwegian football. It is Petter Belsvik's first season as the club's manager after Jörgen Lennartsson joined IF Elfsborg at the end of the previous season. Stabæk also competed in the UEFA Europa League after qualifying through the Fair Play rankings. They entered, and were knocked out, in the first qualifying round against JJK of Finland. On October 28, Stabæk were relegated from the Tippeligaen to the Adeccoligaen with three games still remaining.

Squad

Transfers

Winter

In:

Out:

Summer

In:

Out:

Competitions

Pre-season games

Friendlies

Tippeligaen

Results summary

Results by round

Results

Table

Norwegian Cup

UEFA Europa League

First qualifying round

Squad statistics

Appearances and goals

|-
|colspan="14"|Players away from Stabæk on loan:
|-
|colspan="14"|Players who appeared for Stabæk no longer at the club:

|}

Goal scorers

Disciplinary record

References

Stabæk Fotball seasons
Stabaek